The Winston Giles Orchestra is an Australian band, formed in 2004 by Australian singer-songwriter Winston Giles (Atari Baby, Floor 13). The Winston Giles Orchestra released two albums in 2005 and toured Australia, the US, and Europe.

Currently, the Winston Giles Orchestra comprises Winston Giles (vocals, guitars, piano, beats, and samples) and Dorian West (trumpet, flugelhorn, and keyboards).  They also have guest musicians who make appearances with the band regularly. Themes of their music include the rejection of war, intolerance, and an embrace of love, happiness, cultural diversity, and a simple, carefree life.

Although the Winston Giles Orchestra takes an indie rock and post-punk approach to rock music, the band is also known for their psychedelic arrangements, spacey lyrics, and bizarre song and album titles. They are also acclaimed for their elaborate live shows featuring video projections, complex stage-light configurations, acrobatics, hula hoop and dancers.

History
Winston has a background in both rock and dance, and spent eight years fronting an art-punk band called Floor 13 that began in Melbourne, Australia, and would keep him busy in America for six years. 
After returning to Australia, Winston's lust for fresh sounds saw him involve himself in the emerging local dance music scene, working with many local DJs and producers and culminating in a project called - Atari Baby - releasing several albums and many remixes and videos under that moniker.

In early 2004, Winston met local producer C.J. Dolan, who was behind the electronica outfit, Quench. Winston had been writing new material in search of a unique sound and late 2004, the pair began recording and mixing the debut album, Soundtracks for Sunrise. After four months in the studio, the result was an album that continues to sell worldwide and garner significant attention for the band on Australian, US, and European radio and in mainstream and street-press print media.

The debut album was first released in Australia in December 2004 and was immediately put into rotation at stations around the country. 
Whilst eclectic and unpredictable, the warm, dreamy and emotive feel of the album was popular with clubbers and ravers who were looking for a different sound. 
Tracks such as "We Wait For Sunrise", "Welcome to the hotel" and "Golden", express warmth, whilst the Spanish dance floor influenced, "The Banished Matadors" and the quirky, "A Little Song", contribute to the eclectic feel.

The second album – part of a series of four, was released in November 2005 and continues the theme of a perfect and magical day. The album A magnificent beautiful day features eleven songs written by Giles, with bouncy grooves and beats, smooth gentle guitars, and brash horns. It aims to provide a magical escape and highlights further the imaginative mix of different themes that are the hallmark of the Winston Giles Orchestra. 
From the spaghetti western and Lost Highway influences on the track "Theme from Burning Winchesters", to the dark and raunchy "Secrets to Love", and the emotive vocal-driven single – "All for You", this album maintains the creative output of their debut, yet tracks like "Going Up in a Rocket" and "Not a cloud in the sky", are more upbeat than the contemplative feel of much of Soundtrack for Sunrise.

Concerts by The Winston Giles Orchestra are as eclectic as the music.  Live, the band consists of Winston Giles on guitars and vocals, and Dorian West on horns, keyboards, and beats. Concerts also feature theatrical surprises and talented performers.

In 2006, the band went on their first overseas tour, performing at festivals and clubs across the UK and The US. The band garnered much radio play overseas including BBC radio one in the UK and much college radio play in the US including KCRW in Los Angeles.

The band's albums have been released around the world with plans to tour the UK, Europe, and the US again in 2007.

The band has been performing at Australia's clubs and festivals in 2006 and 2007, including shows in Federation Square in Melbourne and The "Kiss My Grass" festival at The Music Bowl in Melbourne. The "Playground Weekender" festival in Sydney and The "Maitreya" festival in Victoria.

The Winston Giles Orchestra's third studio album was due for release in mid-August 2007.

Sound
The Winston Giles Orchestra sound has been compared to The Flaming Lips, Lemon Jelly, and Pink Floyd. Their sound is often described as a fusion of electronica, downtempo, psychedelic and rock with heavy ambient influences.  Since the release of their debut album Soundtracks for Sunrise in December 2004, The Winston Giles Orchestra has been presenting a new and unique sound that has permeated through to fans of all styles of music.

The orchestra sound is filled with many different sounds and varying moods. While the presence of beats and the influences of dance music lend a modern bent to the sound, familiar licks of guitar-based bands such as Pink Floyd and Led Zeppelin present themselves, but are not obvious, but are subtly incorporated into the modern electronic sound.

Band members
As of 2007, The Winston Giles Orchestra consisted of:

Core members
 Winston Giles (lead vocals, guitars, producer)
 Dorian West (trumpet and lead vocals; recorder and resonator)
 CJ Dolan (producer

Discography

Studio albums
 Magnificent Beautiful Day (2004)

Track listing
"Under a brilliant sun"
"All for you"
"Chakra superstar"
"Secrets to love"
"Theme from Burning Winchesters"
"There are witches in the air"
"The magic touch"
"Make sense out of life"
"Happiness"
"Going up in a rocket"
"Not a cloud in the sky"

 Soundtracks for Sunrise (2005)

Track listing
"We Wait for Sunrise"
"Welcome to the Hotel"
"A Little Song"
"Revenge"
"Mercy for the Wicked"
"Morning Shine"
"All Come Together"
"Golden"
"The Banished Matadors"
"The Hostess"

Singles
 "Welcome to the Hotel" features on Chris Coco's electroacoustic compilation (2006).

References

External links
 Official website
 Myspace site

Musical groups established in 1999
Australian indie rock groups
Dream pop musical groups
Neo-psychedelia groups
Space rock musical groups
1999 establishments in Australia